This article contains a list of current SNCF railway stations in the Provence-Alpes-Côte d'Azur region of France.

Alpes-de-Haute-Provence (04)

 La Brillane-Oraison
 Château-Arnoux-Saint-Auban
 Manosque-Gréoux-les-Bains
 Sisteron

Alpes-Maritimes (06)

 Antibes
 L'Ariane-la-Trinité
 Beaulieu-sur-Mer
 Biot
 Le Bosquet
 Breil-sur-Roya
 La Brigue
 Cagnes-sur-Mer
 Cannes
 Cannes-la-Bocca
 Cap-d'Ail
 Cap-Martin-Roquebrune
 Carnolès
 Cros-de-Cagnes
 Drap-Cantaron
 L'Escarène
 Èze-sur-Mer
 La Frayère
 Fontan-Saorge
 Golfe-Juan-Vallauris
 Grasse
 Juan-les-Pins
 Mandelieu-la-Napoule
 Menton
 Menton-Garavan
 Monaco-Monte-Carlo (also located in Monaco)
 Monte-Carlo-Country-Club
 Mouans-Sartoux
 Nice CP (private railway, not SNCF)
 Nice-Pont-Michel
 Nice-Riquier
 Nice-Saint-Augustin
 Nice-Ville
 Peille
 Peillon-Sainte-Thècle
 Ranguin
 Saint-Dalmas-de-Tende
 Saint-Laurent-du-Var
 Sospel
 Tende
 Théoule-sur-Mer
 Touët-de-l'Escarene
 Le Trayas
 La Trinité-Victor
 Viévola
 Villefranche-sur-Mer
 Villeneuve-Loubet-Plage

Bouches-du-Rhône (13)

 Aix-en-Provence TGV
 Aix-en-Provence
 Arenc-Euroméditerranée
 Arles
 Aubagne
 La Barasse
 Carry-le-Rouet
 Cassis
 La Ciotat
 La Couronne-Carro
 Croix-Sainte
 L'Estaque
 Fos-sur-Mer
 Gardanne
 Istres
 Lamanon
 Marseille-Blancarde
 Marseille-Saint-Charles
 Martigues
 Meyrargues
 Miramas
 Niolon
 Orgon
 Pas-des-Lanciers
 La Penne-sur-Huveaune
 Picon-Busserine
 La Pomme
 Port-de-Bouc
 Rassuen
 La Redonne-Ensuès
 Rognac
 Saint-Antoine
 Saint-Chamas
 Sainte-Marthe-en-Provence
 Saint-Joseph-le-Castellas
 Saint-Marcel
 Saint-Martin-de-Crau
 Salon
 Sausset-les-Pins
 Sénas
 Septèmes
 Simiane
 Tarascon
 Vitrolles-Aéroport-Marseille-Provence

Hautes-Alpes (05)

 L'Argentière-les-Ecrins
 Aspres-sur-Buëch
 Briançon
 Chorges
 Embrun
 Gap
 Laragne
 Mont-Dauphin-Guillestre
 Serres
 Veynes-Dévoluy

Var (83)

 Agay
 Anthéor-Cap-Roux
 Les Arcs–Draguignan
 Bandol
 Boulouris-sur-Mer
 Carnoules
 La Crau
 Cuers-Pierrefeu
 Le Dramont
 Fréjus
 La Garde
 Gonfaron
 Hyères
 Le Luc et Le Cannet
 Ollioules-Sanary-sur-Mer
 La Pauline-Hyères
 Pignans
 Puget-Ville
 Saint-Cyr-Les Lecques-La Cadière
 Saint-Raphaël-Valescure
 La Seyne–Six-Fours
 Solliès-Pont
 Toulon
 Le Trayas
 Vidauban

Vaucluse (84)

 Avignon-Centre
 Avignon TGV
 Bédarrides
 Bollène-La Croisière
 Carpentras
 Cavaillon
 Courthézon
 Entraigues-sur-la-Sorgue
 Gadagne
 L'Isle-sur-la-Sorgue-Fontaine-de-Vaucluse
 Monteux
 Montfavet
 Morières-lès-Avignon
 Orange
 Pertuis
 Saint-Saturnin-d'Avignon
 Sorgues-Châteauneuf-du-Pape
 Le Thor

See also
 SNCF 
 List of SNCF stations for SNCF stations in other regions

Provence